Southern University College (abbreviated as Southern UC), is a non-profit, private university college in Malaysia. It is the first non-profit higher education institute and private university college in Skudai, Johor.

Currently, Southern UC has 7 faculties, 3 schools, 6 research institutes and 7 academic centres.

History
The establishment of the Southern UC was to provide an education channel at home for high school graduates when they were unable to further studies in foreign countries.

Foon Yew Advanced Studies Programme was setting up in 1975, where later on the Foon Yew Board of Directors made application to the Ministry of Education for setting up Foon Yew College on the foundation of this programme. With the persistence and efforts of the Chinese community, Southern College was approved by the Ministry of Education and established in 1990. Through 22 years of management and efforts, the Ministry of Higher Education approved Southern College to upgrade to Southern University College on 19 June 2012.

Campus

Southern University College is located in Skudai area, Johor Bahru, Malaysia, which is in the Iskandar Malaysia Economic Zone. The campus is about 25 acres, donated by the philanthropist Seow Wan Heong. Following the development of Iskandar Malaysia Economic Zone, Southern UC will be one of the significant educational institutes of Malaysia and slowly develop as an international educational institute.

Faculties
{
  "type": "ExternalData",
  "service": "geoshape",
  "ids": "Q17054075",
  "properties": {
    "title": "Southern University College",
    "description": "Campus",
  }
}

 Faculty of Business & Management
 Department of Accounting & Finance
 Department of Marketing
 Department of Management
 Department of Tourism Management
 Department of Postgraduate and Quality Assurance
 Faculty of Engineering & Information Technology
 Department of Computer Science
 Department of Electrical & Electronics Engineering
 Faculty of Humanities & Social Sciences
 Department of Chinese
 Department of English
 Department of Malay
 Department of Journalism and Communication
 Faculty of Art & Design
 Department of Industrial Design
 Department of Visual Communication
 Department of Art
 Faculty of Chinese Medicine
 Department of Chinese Medicine
 Faculty of Education and Psychology
 Department of Education
 Southern Institute of Technical Education (SITE)

Schools
 School of Foundation & Studies
 School of Professional & Continuing Education (SPACE)

Research Institutes
 Institute of Graduate Studies and Research (IGSR)
 Research Institute of Chinese Ethnicity & Culture (RICEC)
 Center for Malaysian Studies (CMS)
 Center for Business and Economic Research (CBER)
 Center for Computing and Electronics Engineering(CCEE)

Academic Centres
 Sim Mow Yu Chinese Education and Teacher Training Centre (SMYCE)
 Southern Traditional Chinese Medical Centre
 Excellent Teaching and Learning Centre (ETLC)
 International Education And Exchange Centre
 Incubation & Career Centre (EICC)
 Modern Language Centre
 General Studies Centre

Rankings and awards
Southern University College was awarded 4-star (Very good) rating for the overall college-based category in MyQUEST 2010/2011.

Partner Institutions 

 China
University of Chinese Academy of Sciences Basics Education Institute
Beijing Language and Culture University
Shenzhen University
Nankai University
Xiamen University
Soochow University
South China University of Technology
South China Normal University
Hengyang Normal University
Anhui Normal University
Nanjing Forestry University
Hainan University
Hanshan Normal University
Hunan University
Hunan Normal University
East China Normal University
Central China Normal University
Jilin University
Central South University
Nanjing Tech University
Nanjing Normal University
Nanjing University of Science and Technology
University of Jinan
Liaoning University
Changsha University of Science and Technology
Shaanxi Normal University
University of Science and Technology Beijing
Kaifeng Cultural Art Occupation College
 Germany
Schiller International University
 Japan
Aichi University
Shokei University
 Malaysia
Curtin University Malaysia
City University Malaysia
Wawasan Open University
 Singapore
PSB Academy
 South Korea
Busan University of Foreign Studies
 Taiwan
National Cheng Kung University
National Sun Yat-sen University
National Chi Nan University
National Changhua University of Education
National Chin-Yi University of Technology
National Taiwan Ocean University
National Quemoy University
Feng Chia University
Ming Chuan University
Chinese Culture University
Shih Hsin University
Ta Hwa University of Science and Technology
Dayeh University
Takming University of Science and Technology
Tungnan University
Hwa Hsia University of Technology
TransWorld University
Lunghwa University of Science and Technology
Nanhua University
Nan Jeon University of Science and Technology
Tainan University of Technology
Chang Gung University
University of Kang Ning
Shu-Te University
Hsiuping University of Science and Technology
Wenzao Ursuline University of Languages
I-Shou University
Yuan Ze University
Chaoyang University of Technology
Oriental Institute of Technology
 United Kingdom
University of Hertfordshire
 Vietnam
Long An University of Economics and Industry
Viet Bac University

References

External links

 Official Southern University College Website

Private universities and colleges in Malaysia
Buildings and structures in Iskandar Puteri
Colleges in Malaysia
Educational institutions established in 1990
Business schools in Malaysia
Universities and colleges in Johor
Medical schools in Malaysia
Art schools in Malaysia
Design schools in Malaysia
Hospitality schools in Malaysia
Engineering universities and colleges in Malaysia
Information technology schools in Malaysia
1990 establishments in Malaysia
Malaysian educational websites